John Bumpass Calhoun (May 11, 1917 – September 7, 1995) was an American ethologist and behavioral researcher noted for his studies of population density and its effects on behavior. He claimed that the bleak effects of overpopulation on rodents were a grim model for the future of the human race. During his studies, Calhoun coined the term "behavioral sink" to describe aberrant behaviors in overcrowded population density situations and "beautiful ones" to describe passive individuals who withdrew from all social interaction. His work gained world recognition. He spoke at conferences around the world and his opinion was sought by groups as diverse as NASA and the District of Columbia's Panel on overcrowding in local jails. Calhoun's rat studies were used as a basis in the development of Edward T. Hall's 1966 proxemics theories.

Early life and education
John Bumpass Calhoun was born May 11, 1917, in Elkton, Tennessee, the third child of James Calhoun and Fern Madole Calhoun. Their first child died in infancy. Calhoun had three siblings: an older sister, Polly; and two younger brothers, Billy and Dan. His father was a high school principal who rose to a position in administration in the Tennessee Department of Education. His mother was an artist.

Calhoun's family moved from Elkton to Brownsville, Tennessee, and finally to Nashville, when Calhoun was in junior high school. At this time, Calhoun began attending meetings of the Tennessee Ornithological Society. Mrs. Laskey, distinguished for her work in bird banding and in the study of the chimney swift, was a pivotal influence on his developing interest in birds and bird habits. Calhoun spent his junior high and high school years banding birds and recording the habits of birds. His first published article was in The Migrant, the journal of the Tennessee Ornithological Society when he was 15 years old.

Despite his father's refusal to help him attend an out-of-state university, Calhoun made his way to the University of Virginia where he earned his bachelor's degree in 1939. During the summers, he worked for Alexander Wetmore, head of the Smithsonian Institution in Washington, D.C., doing ornithology work. He then earned his M.S. and Ph.D. from Northwestern University in 1942 and 1943. The subject of his thesis was the 24-hour rhythms of the Norway rat.

Calhoun met his future wife, Edith Gressley, at Northwestern, where she was a biology major and a student in one of his classes.

Career

Early rat studies
After graduating from Northwestern, he taught at Emory University and Ohio State University. In 1946, he and his wife, Edith, moved to Towson, Maryland, a suburb of Baltimore. Calhoun worked on the Rodent Ecology Project at Johns Hopkins University. In March 1947, he began a 28-month study of a colony of Norway rats in a  outdoor pen. Even though five females over this time-span could theoretically produce 5,000 healthy progeny for this size pen, Calhoun found that the population never exceeded 200 individuals, and stabilized at 150. Moreover, the rats were not randomly scattered throughout the pen area, but had organized themselves into twelve or thirteen local colonies of a dozen rats each. He noted that twelve rats is the maximum number that can live harmoniously in a natural group, beyond which stress and psychological effects function as group break-up forces.

While posted at Jackson Lab in Bar Harbor, Maine, Calhoun continued studying the Norway rat colony until 1951. While in Bar Harbor, his first daughter, Cat Calhoun, was born. The family lived in the guesthouse on the Luquer estate.

In 1951, Calhoun and family moved back to Silver Spring, Maryland. He worked for Walter Reed Army Medical Center in the division of neuropsychiatry before gaining his position at the National Institutes of Health in 1954 where he worked for the next 33 years. 1954 was also the year his second daughter, Cheshire Calhoun, was born.

Norway rat experiments
Calhoun pursued his experiments in behavior, using domesticated Norway rats, at his lab on the second floor of a huge barn on the Casey farm in the country outside Rockville, MD. The area is now a suburban center but the barn still stands, renovated for suburban usage. In the days of Calhoun's occupancy there was a small, cluttered office area at the top of the stairs. The rodent odor was overpowering, and it took some time before one could breathe normally.

The research area was divided into three parts. In the center section a box-like room was built. There was a hallway all the way around this box and stairs that led to the top of it. This box was divided into 4 rooms, or habitats, . Each room had a door for a researcher or caretaker to enter by, and in the ceiling of each room was a glass window. The activity in each room could be observed through these windows. Each room was divided into quarters by  partitions. "V" shaped ramps connected pens I and II, II and III, and III and IV. Pens I and IV were not connected. Mounted on the wall in the corner of each quarter was an artificial burrow, which could be accessed via a spiral staircase. Each quarter also contained a drinking station and a feeding station. These variations in environment led to differences in behavior patterns and ultimately to the concept of "behavioral sinks".

The research carried on in the lab on Casey's farm began in 1958 and lasted until 1962, when Calhoun was invited to spend a year at The Center for Advanced Study in the Behavioral Sciences in Stanford, California.

Mouse experiments

In the early 1960s, the National Institute of Mental Health (NIMH) acquired property in a rural area outside Poolesville, Maryland. The facility that was built on this property housed several research projects, including those headed by Calhoun. It was here that his most famous experiment, the mouse universe, was created. In July 1968, four pairs of mice were introduced into the habitat. The habitat was a  square metal pen with  sides. Each side had four groups of four vertical, wire mesh "tunnels". The "tunnels" gave access to nesting boxes, food hoppers, and water dispensers. There was no shortage of food or water or nesting material. There were no predators. The only adversity was the limit on space.

Initially, the population grew rapidly, doubling every 55 days. The population reached 620 by day 315, after which the population growth dropped markedly, doubling only every 145 days. The last surviving birth was on day 600, bringing the total population to a mere 2200 mice, even though the experiment setup allowed for as many as 3840 mice in terms of nesting space. This period between day 315 and day 600 saw a breakdown in social structure and in normal social behavior. Among the aberrations in behavior were the following: expulsion of young before weaning was complete, wounding of young, increase in homosexual behavior, inability of dominant males to maintain the defense of their territory and females, aggressive behavior of females, passivity of non-dominant males with increased attacks on each other which were not defended against.

After day 600, the social breakdown continued and the population declined toward extinction. During this period females ceased to reproduce. Their male counterparts withdrew completely, never engaging in courtship or fighting and only engaging in tasks that were essential to their health. They ate, drank, slept, and groomed themselves – all solitary pursuits. Sleek, healthy coats and an absence of scars characterized these males. They were dubbed "the beautiful ones". Breeding never resumed and behavior patterns were permanently changed.

The conclusions drawn from this experiment were that when all available space is taken and all social roles filled, competition and the stresses experienced by the individuals will result in a total breakdown in complex social behaviors, ultimately resulting in the demise of the population.

Calhoun saw the fate of the population of mice as a metaphor for the potential fate of man. He characterized the social breakdown as a "second death", with reference to the "second death" mentioned in the Biblical book of Revelation. His study has been cited by writers such as Bill Perkins as a warning of the dangers of living in an "increasingly crowded and impersonal world". Others took different lessons; medical historian Edmund Ramsden has hypothesized that the mouse society fell from excessive social interaction, rather than density per se. A writer in io9 stated "Instead of a population problem, one could argue that (the mouse universe) had a fair distribution problem."

Reception and legacy
During the 1960s, Calhoun and Leonard Duhl formed an informal group, the Space Cadets, which met to discuss the social uses of space. The members of this group came from as diverse professions as architecture, city planning, physics, and psychiatry. In Calhoun's own words: 

Mrs. Frisby and the Rats of NIMH (1973), by Robert C. O'Brien and published in 1971, was inspired by Calhoun's work. The book later inspired an animated film, The Secret of NIMH. Edmund Ramsden described one of Calhoun's experiments in which rats were placed in a sealed enclosure: 

Calhoun's phrase "behavioral sink" was sometimes used by others in reference to perceived urban moral degradation. Alan Grant, co-creator of the dystopian Judge Dredd character, has acknowledged Calhoun's work as an influence. Ramsden believes Calhoun's work may have influenced other apocalyptic fiction as well, including Soylent Green.

Calhoun wrote or edited a number of publications, including:
 The Role of Temperature and Natural Selection in Relation to the Variations in the Size of the English Sparrow in the United States (1947)
 Social Welfare as a Variable in Population Dynamics (1957)
 Calculation of Home Range and Density of Small Mammals (with James U. Casby, 1958)
 The Ecology and Sociology of the Norway Rat (1962)
 Environment and Population: Problems of Adaptation: An Experimental Book Integrating Statements by 162 Contributors (editor, 1983)

Calhoun died on 7 September 1995 at the age of 78. His papers were donated to the National Library of Medicine by Edith Calhoun and the American Heritage Center.

Publications
 
 
 
 
 
 Calhoun, John B. (Jan 1973) “Death Squared: The Explosive Growth and Demise of a Mouse Population,” in Proceedings of the Royal Society of Medicine, vol. 66, pp. 80–88. Available at http://www.ncbi.nlm.nih.gov/pmc/articles/PMC1644264. 

 Calhoun, John B. (Jan 1973) “Death Squared: The Explosive Growth and Demise of a Mouse Population,” in Proceedings of the Royal Society of Medicine, vol. 66, pp. 80–88. Available at http://www.ncbi.nlm.nih.gov/pmc/articles/PMC1644264. 

 Calhoun, John B. (Jan 1973) “Death Squared: The Explosive Growth and Demise of a Mouse Population,” in Proceedings of the Royal Society of Medicine, vol. 66, pp. 80–88. Available at http://www.ncbi.nlm.nih.gov/pmc/articles/PMC1644264.

See also
 Lek mating
 Proxemics

References

Bibliography

External links

Ethologists
20th-century American psychologists
People from Giles County, Tennessee
1917 births
1995 deaths
20th-century American zoologists